is a Japanese fantasy manga series by Daisuke Hiyama. It has been serialized in Futabasha's seinen manga magazine Monthly Action since August 2017 and has been collected in twelve tankōbon volumes. The manga is licensed in North America by Seven Seas Entertainment. An anime television series adaptation by Wolfsbane aired from July to September 2020. A second season by Wolfsbane and Seven aired from October to December 2022.

Plot
Peter Grill, warrior of the Brave Swordsmen's Guild, has emerged victorious at an international fighting tournament and is crowned the strongest man in the world. Peter uses this victory to gain permission from Guildmaster Sanctos to marry his beloved daughter and fellow Guildmember, Luvelia. However, women from other races have heard of Peter's exploits and seek the "seed" of the strongest man to continue their respective bloodlines, with or without his consent. Meanwhile, the Guildmaster's obsession with his own daughter drives him to find a way to end Luvelia's relationship, as Peter tries to hide his new lovers from them both.

Characters

Peter is a warrior who is crowned the strongest man in the world. With his victory, he plans on marrying Luvelia Sanctos. However, this catches the attention of women from other races who want to be with him. 

Luvelia is Peter's fiancée and Guildmaster Sanctos' daughter. Peter has been dating Luvelia for two years and he wants to take their relationship to the next level. However, thanks to her father's overprotective personality, they have never gone beyond the act of holding hands and she is naive in terms of where babies come from.

Lisa is the princess of the ogre tribe. She wants to sleep with Peter in order to produce strong offspring.

Mimi is Lisa's younger sister. Like Lisa, Mimi wants to sleep with Peter in order to produce strong offspring.

Vegan is an arrogant elf who places a curse on Peter in order to force him to mate with her and produce stronger elvish offspring.

Piglette is a female orc who is considered to be ugly by Orcish standards due to her human-like appearance. After getting the chance to mate with Peter, she decides to stay with him in order to get revenge on her clansmen in Orcland who debased her.

Tim is Peter's guildmate and confidant who keeps Peter's infidelity a secret.

Gobuko is a goblin girl and Peter's long-lost childhood friend and adopted sister who later joins his harem.

Lucy is Peter's younger sister, a frighteningly strong warrior who wields two broadswords.

Fruitalia is Vegan's younger sister who hopes to steal Peter's seed for herself using magical enhancements.

Mithlim is a dwarven inventor who demands Peter's seed to test her inventions in exchange for repairing a sacred sword.

Media

Manga
Peter Grill and the Philosopher's Time is written and illustrated by Daisuke Hiyama. It began serialization in Futabasha's Monthly Action magazine on August 25, 2017. Futabasha has compiled its chapters into individual tankōbon volumes. The first volume was published on January 12, 2018. As of March 9, 2023, twelve volumes have been published. The manga is licensed in North America by Seven Seas Entertainment.

Volume list

Anime
An anime television series adaptation was announced in the November 2019 issue of Monthly Action on September 25, 2019. The series was animated by Wolfsbane and directed by Tatsumi, with Nora Mōri writing the scripts and Rui Ishige designing the characters. It aired from July 11 to September 26, 2020 on Tokyo MX, AT-X, and GYT. The opening theme song, was performed by Yui Ninomiya as her character Luvelia Sanctos. The ending theme song, was performed by Hilcrhyme. Shusei's Project performed an insert song titled "Ti amo". Sentai Filmworks has licensed the series and streamed it on HIDIVE. Crunchyroll also streamed the series. 

On August 13, 2020, HIDIVE announced that the series would receive an English dub.

On November 11, 2021, it was announced that a second season had been greenlit. The second season, titled , features returning staff and cast, with Seven involved as the secondary studio. It aired from October 10 to December 26, 2022 on Tokyo MX, AT-X, and BS Fuji. The opening theme song, was performed by Isekaijoucho. The ending theme song, was performed by Hilcrhyme.

Episode list

Peter Grill and the Philosopher's Time

Peter Grill and the Philosopher's Time: Super Extra

Mobile game
An RPG of the series titled  was released on October 11, 2022.

Notes

References

External links
  
 

Anime series based on manga
Censored television series
Comedy anime and manga
Fantasy anime and manga
Futabasha manga
Harem anime and manga
Seinen manga
Sentai Filmworks
Seven (animation studio)
Seven Seas Entertainment titles
Tokyo MX original programming
Wolfsbane (animation studio)